The Golden-red stiphodon Stiphodon rutilaureus is a species of goby found in Papua New Guinea, the Solomon Islands and Vanuatu.
  
This species can reach a length of  SL.

References

rutilaureus
Taxa named by Ronald E. Watson
Fish described in 1996